Brian Blaney  (born 26 February 1982 in Dublin) is a professional rugby union player who played at Hooker for Leinster and now plays for London Irish.

Early life and education
Blaney went to Terenure College in Dublin, which is one of the main rugby nurseries in Ireland. His brothers, David & James Blaney, are former Leinster rugby players.  His cousin, Greg Blaney, won 2 All-Ireland Senior Football Championship medals with  a famous exponent of Down in the 1991,'94.

Playing career
He joined London Irish at the start of 2010/11 season. During his time at Leinster, Blaney made 71 Appearances and scored 5 tries. He won a Magners League medal 2007/08 season and European Cup medal 2008/09

Honours
He won 5 caps playing for Ireland Wolfhounds (v France, USA, NZ Maori, England, Australia).

References

External links
 London Irish
 Leinster Rugby

1982 births
Living people
Irish rugby union players
Terenure College RFC players
Leinster Rugby players
London Irish players
Rugby union players from Dublin (city)
Rugby union hookers
Irish expatriate sportspeople in England
Expatriate rugby union players in England
Irish expatriate rugby union players